Count Guglielmo Lochis (1789 – 25 July 1859) was an Italian nobleman, politician, art collector and art connoisseur.

Born in Mozzo into a family which had been active in Bergamo since the 16th century and which had held the title of count since the 18th century, he entered public life in 1816 as a member of the Lombard-Venetian guard during the visit to Bergamo of Francis II, Holy Roman Emperor. In 1835 Bergamo's Accademia Carrara made him its auction commissioner; he also served as the city's podestà from 1842 to 1848, with his resignation from the latter role triggered by the Revolutions of 1848. He died in Bergamo.

Collection
Lochis acquired several artworks in the 1820s, gathering a collection of around 500 works in Villa delle Crocette in Mozzo, which became a stop on the tourist-trail in the area. Two-thirds of the collection was left to the city as the Fondo Lochis on the stipulation that these works remain in the Villa, with the rest remaining with the family or sold off on the art market; the Portrait of a Scholar or Portrait of a Gentleman of the Albani Family by Giovanni Battista Moroni, for example, is now in a private collection in Berlin. The city found the will's condition hard to meet and so in 1866 renegotiated with Guglielmo's heir Carlo to allow the works to be hung in a room in the Accademia Carrara with the Lochis coat of arms over the door.

The works which went to the Accademia included:
 Madonna and Child by Jacopo Bellini
 Madonna and Child by Giovanni Bellini
 Pietà by Giovanni Bellini
 Madonna and Child with Saints by Palma Vecchio
 Madonna and Child by Carlo Crivelli
  Madonna and Child  by Cosmè Tura
 Madonna del Latte by Ambrogio da Fossano
 Saint Ambrose Meeting the Emperor Theodosius by Ambrogio da Fossano 
 Holy Family with Saint Catherine of Alexandria by Lorenzo Lotto
 Nativity of Mary with Saints James, Anthony Abbot, Andrew, Dominic, Lawrence and Nicholas of Bari by Vittore Carpaccio
 Portrait of a Gentleman by Altobello Melone
 Saint Sebastian by Raphael
 Holy Family with the Infant Saint John the Baptist by Moretto da Brescia
 The Crucified Christ with a Devotee by Moretto da Brescia
 Adoration of the Christ Child by Bernardino Luini
 Madonna and Child by Titian
 Orpheus and Eurydice by Titian
 Madonna and Child Triptych by Gerolamo Giovenone
 Saint Nicholas of Tolentino by Giovanni Battista Moroni
 Portrait of a Child of the Redetti Family  by Giovanni Battista Moroni
 Saint Francis Receiving the Stigmata by El Greco
 Portrait of Ulisse Aldovrandi by Agostino Carracci 
 Portrait of a Child by Diego Velázquez
 Madonna del Sassoferrato by Fra Galgario
 Portrait of Francesco Maria Bruntino by Fra Galgario
 The Grand Canal at Palazzo Balbi by Canaletto 
 Saint Maximus and Saint Oswald by Giovan Battista Tiepolo
 View by Francesco Guardi
 Il ridotto by Pietro Longhi

References

Bibliography
  Giovanni Lochis, La pinacoteca e la villa Lochis alla Crocetta di Mosso presso Bergamo, Arnaldo Forni editore, 1858.
  G. Brambilla, Guglielmo Lochis patrizio bergamasco e conoisseur europeo, Atti dell'Ateneo di Scienze Lettere ed Arti di Bergamo, 1995–6, pp. 393–410.
  G. Brambilla Ranise, Una vita, una collezione, un tradimento. Guglielmo Lochis (1789–1859) e la sua raccolta, Bergomum, 2005, p. 225–288.

Italian art collectors
1789 births
1859 deaths
Politicians from the Province of Bergamo
Accademia Carrara di Belle Arti di Bergamo